Uranium(IV) iodide, also known as uranium tetraiodide, is an inorganic chemical compound. It is a salt of uranium in oxidation state +4 and iodine.

Preparation 
Uranium tetraiodide can be prepared from the reaction between uranium and an excess of iodine.

Properties 
Uranium tetraiodide is a black solid and forms needle-like crystals. Upon heating, it dissociates into uranium triiodide and iodine gas. It crystallizes in the monoclinic crystal system, space group C2/c.

References 

Uranium(IV) compounds
Iodides
Actinide halides